The American Buffalo silver dollar is a commemorative silver dollar issued by the United States Mint in 2001. The coin commemorates both the National Museum of the American Indian and the Buffalo nickel, the latter serving as the basis for the dollar's design.

Design 
The design of the coin was based on the Buffalo nickel designed by James Earle Fraser in 1913.  The obverse features an American Indian head that Fraser had based on the Sioux Iron Tail, the Kiowa Big Tree, and the Cheyenne Two Moons.  The reverse features an American bison standing on a mound, which was based on the original Buffalo nickel reverse produced only in 1913.

Production and sales 
Public Law 106–375 authorized a maximum mintage of 500,000 American Buffalo dollars.  The coins went on sale on June 7, 2001, and sold out just 2 weeks later on June 21.  The Philadelphia Mint produced 227,131 uncirculated and 272,869 proof coins.  Because the coins were so popular, the National Museum of the American Indian requested an additional 250,000 or 500,000 coins to be produced, but this request was denied.

See also 

 American Buffalo (coin), another coin based on the Buffalo nickel
 Buffalo nickel
 List of United States commemorative coins and medals (2000s)
 United States commemorative coins

References

2001 establishments in the United States
Bison on coins
Modern United States commemorative coins
Native Americans on coins
Works by James Earle Fraser (sculptor)
National Museum of the American Indian